Mexican Americans have lived in Los Angeles since the original Pobladores, the 44 original settlers and 4 soldiers who founded the city in 1781. People of Mexican descent make up 31.9% of Los Angeles residents, and 32% of Los Angeles County residents.

History

Nuestra Señora Reina de los Angeles Asistencia was founded in early 1784 within the burgeoning Pueblo de Los Ángeles as an asistencia (or "sub-mission") to the nearby Mission San Gabriel Arcángel. 

The city's original barrios were located in the eastern half of the city and the unincorporated community of East Los Angeles. The trend of Hispanization began in 1970, then accelerated in the 1980s and 1990s with immigration from Mexico and Central America (especially El Salvador, Honduras, and Guatemala).  These immigrants settled in the city's eastern and southern neighborhoods. By 2000, South Los Angeles was a majority Mexican area, displacing most previous African-American and Asian-American residents. The city is often said to have the largest Mexican population outside Mexico and has the largest Spanish-speaking population outside Latin America or Spain. As of 2007, estimates of the number of residents originally from the Mexican state of Oaxaca ranged from 50,000 to 250,000. Montebello was the first Spanish settlement in California in Los Angeles County.

Early 20th Century

1900-WWI 
Job contracts, sponsored by the US government in partnership with the Mexican government, initially motivated Mexican immigrants to migrate to Los Angeles.

Post-WWI Era (1920s-30s) 
Post-World War I fear of communism manifested itself in Los Angeles through an increased nationalistic, anti-immigrant sentiment. While prominent politicians such as former governor Hiram Johnson and activist Simon Lubin advocated for progressive policies, such as women's rights and labor rights, local politics of Los Angeles county and California at large leaned conservative, with governor Friend W. Richardson reallocating the Americanization programs to the California Department of Education in 1923. The goal of these Americanization programs was to assimilate immigrants into "the American way of life" and particularly targeted Mexican immigrants because of their perceived ethnic proximity to Europeans relative to other immigrant groups, such as the Chinese and Japanese; the main way this was achieved was through the instruction of the English language. At first, these programs prioritized Mexican men, registering them through their workplaces, but because of the seasonal nature of farm work, teaching English successfully was not possible.

Aligning with the American ideal of Republican motherhood, assimilation efforts were eventually redirected toward Mexican women, who were usually in charge of the home and more involved in community institutions like schools than Mexican men. The new goal of Americanization programs then became training Mexican women for domestic work, to help "alleviate the shortage of housemaids, seamstresses, laundresses, and service workers." By making Mexican women, the homemakers, more American, Americanists hoped that Mexican culture would slowly phase out of immigrants' lives; for example, replacing tortillas with bread during meals. These efforts to push Mexican women into newly-profitable, domestic work outside of the home was met with resistance, which Americanists attributed to machismo in Mexican culture. When naturalization rates of Mexican immigrants did not improve, Americanization programs shifted focus yet again to the implementation of Americanization curriculum in schools, in an effort to teach American values to American-born children of Mexican immigrants. Despite these programs promising full integration into American society, they only provided "idealized versions of American values" and second-class citizenship, as Mexican immigrants continued to face economic disenfranchisement and their children received an unequal education to their white counterparts.

WWII Era (1940s) 
Agricultural labor shortages associated with World War II brought on another wave of Mexican immigration to Los Angeles. The bracero program, or guest worker program, was a partnership between the US and Mexican governments, as well as American farms, to bring Mexican agricultural workers to the United States through labor contracts. With a demand for workers that exceeded the supply of labor contracts, the bracero program inadvertently became one of the origins of undocumented immigration from Mexico to the United States.

Today

As of 2010, about 2.5 million residents of the Greater Los Angeles area are of Mexican American origin/heritage.

As of 1996 Mexican-Americans make up about 80% of the Latino population in the Los Angeles area. As of 1996 the Los Angeles region had around 3,736,000 people of Mexican origins.

There's a shift of second and third generation Mexican-Americans out of Los Angeles into nearby suburbs, such as Ventura County, Orange County, San Diego and the Inland Empire, California region. Mexican and other Latin American immigrants moved in East and South sections of L.A. and sometimes, Asian immigrants moved into historic barrios to become mostly Asian-American areas. Starting in the late 1980s, Downey has become a renowned Latino majority community in Southern California, and the majority of residents moved in were middle or upper-middle class, and second and third generation Mexican-Americans. The Mexican population is increasing in the Antelope Valley such as Palmdale.

Suburban cities in Los Angeles County like Azusa, Baldwin Park, City of Industry, Duarte, El Monte, Irwindale, La Puente, Montebello, Rosemead, San Gabriel, South Gate, South El Monte, West Covina, Whittier and especially Pomona have large a Mexican population.

Culture
Mexican Americans from Los Angeles have celebrated the Cinco de Mayo holiday since the 1860s. They, along with other Spanish-speaking peoples, celebrate the Day of the Three Wise Kings as a gift giving holiday.

Zoot suits were a staple of Mexican-American attire in the 1940s. The wearing of soot suits represented rebellion against the injustices of society.

In the 1990s the quebradita dancing style was popular among Mexican-Americans in Greater Los Angeles.

The El Centro Cultural de Mexico is located in Santa Ana.

Plaza Mexico is located in Lynwood.

Two films, Tortilla Soup and Real Women Have Curves, portray Mexican-American families in the Los Angeles area.

Another film that portrays the life of a Mexican-American in Los Angeles is Stand and Deliver, which demonstrates the life of Mexican-American high school students and how they get through their academic struggles, with the help of their teacher, Jaime Escalante (Edward James Olmos).

Notable Mexican Americans from Los Angeles
Notable Mexican Americans from Los Angeles
 

 Constance Marie (actress)
 Pio Pico, last Californio governor (1840s).
 Rodolfo Acuña (scholar)
 Gustavo Arellano (publisher of the OC Weekly)
 Bobby Chacon (boxer, hall of fame member)
 Alexa Demie (actress)
 Rene Enriquez (mobster)
 Tom Fears (NFL player, hall of fame member)
 William A. Fraker (cinematographer, six-time Oscar nominee)
 Guy Gabaldon (U.S. Marine, WWII hero)
 Eric Garcetti (politician, Mayor of Los Angeles)
 Kid Frost (rapper)
 John Gavin (actor)
 Eduardo C. Gomez (U.S. Army, Medal of Honor recipient)
 David M. Gonzales (U.S. Army, Medal of Honor recipient)
 Pancho Gonzales (tennis legend)
 Genaro Hernández (boxer, world champion)
 Oscar De La Hoya (boxer, hall of fame member)
 Rebbeca Marie Gomez a.k.a. Becky G (actress)
 Emile Kuri (film set decorator, Oscar winner)
 Los Lobos (rock band)
 George Lopez (actor, comedian)

 Cheech Marin (actor)
 Miguel (singer)
 Yvette Mimieux (actress)
 Julia Goldani Telles (actress)
 Ricardo Montalban (actor)
 Edward James Olmos (actor)
 Anthony Quinn (actor, two-time Oscar winner)
 Efren Ramirez (actor)
 Richard Ramirez (serial killer)
 Paul Rodriguez (skateboarder)
 Teresa Ruiz (actress)
 Zack de la Rocha (lead vocalist of the rock band Rage Against the Machine)
 Andy Russell (singer)
 Rubén Salazar (journalist)
 María Elena Salinas (journalist)
 Lupita Tovar (actress)
 Danny Trejo (actor)
 Ritchie Valens (singer and recording artist)
 Tiburcio Vásquez (bandit, folk hero to some)
 Antonio Villaraigosa (politician, Mayor of Los Angeles)

See also

East Los Angeles
Los Angeles Plaza
Olvera Street
El Mercado de Los Angeles
Whittier Boulevard
Siege of Los Angeles
Botiller v. Dominguez
Battle of Chavez Ravine
Sleepy Lagoon murder
Zoot Suit Riots
East L.A. walkouts
Chicano Moratorium
Fernandomania
Chicano
Zoot Suit (play)
Lowrider
Asco (art collective)
Self Help Graphics & Art community center
East Los Streetscapers Public Art Studios
Social and Public Art Resource Center
Los Four artist collective
Brown Berets

References

Further reading

External links
 
 
 
 

Mexicans
History of Los Angeles
Mexican-American history